2022 Filmfare OTT Awards, the third edition of awards were presented to honour artistic and technical excellence in original programming on over-the-top streaming media in Hindi-language. Web original shows or films released across OTT platforms between 1 August 2021 and 31 July 2022 were eligible for Awards. Nominations were announced by Filmfare on 14 December 2022. Hosted by Gauahar Khan and Maniesh Paul, the ceremony was held on 21 December 2022 in Mumbai. Biographical television series, Rocket Boys won the best drama series award and Social comedy film, Dasvi won the best film – (Web Originals) award.

Winners and nominees

Popular awards

Critics' Choice Awards

See also
 Filmfare Awards
 67th Filmfare Awards
 2021 Filmfare OTT Awards

References

External links

Award ceremonies in India
OTT, 2022
Filmfare OTT